The Justice Samuel Freeman Miller House  is a historic building in Keokuk, Iowa, United States. It is now operated as the Miller House Museum by the Lee County Historical Society. The significance of this house is its association with Samuel Freeman Miller who had it built. Originally from Kentucky, he was a physician and a lawyer with a national reputation. Miller was nominated by President Abraham Lincoln to serve on the United States Supreme Court in 1862. His was the first nomination to the court of a person who resided west of the Mississippi River. He served on the court for 28 years. Although he lived here for only two years, Miller always considered this his home.

The house is a two-story structure designed in the Italianate style. It has an exposed basement on the rear of the structure. The brick residence is capped with a low-pitched hip roof and bracketed eaves. The bracketed porch on the main level features a balcony on the second floor. The house was listed on the National Register of Historic Places in 1972.

References

External links
 Miller House Museum

Houses completed in 1859
Italianate architecture in Iowa
Houses in Keokuk, Iowa
Houses on the National Register of Historic Places in Iowa
National Register of Historic Places in Lee County, Iowa
Museums in Lee County, Iowa
Historic house museums in Iowa